D508 is a state road in Lika region of Croatia connecting D218 state road near Donji Lapac to the D1 state road near Gračac and further on to the A1 motorway Sveti Rok interchange.

The road, as well as all other state roads in Croatia, is managed and maintained by Hrvatske ceste, a state-owned company.

Traffic volume 

Traffic is regularly counted and reported by Hrvatske ceste (HC), operator of the road.

Road junctions and populated areas

See also
 State roads in Croatia
 Hrvatske ceste

Sources

State roads in Croatia
Lika-Senj County
Transport in Zadar County

hr:Državna cesta D218